H.M. Baker is a pseudonym of Branislav Kerac, a comic book artist from Serbia. He first use this pen name in a short Western story in 1976.

Credits in American comics include The Black Pearl and Ghost for Dark Horse Comics.

Baker is known for a "clean" style, evocative of John Romita, Sr.

References

Living people
Serbian comics artists
Year of birth missing (living people)